Ahmed Al-Sadah (Arabic:أحمد السادة) (born 21 May 1991) is a Qatari footballer.

External links

References

Qatari footballers
1991 births
Living people
Qatar SC players
Al Kharaitiyat SC players
Al-Shamal SC players
Qatar Stars League players
Qatari Second Division players
Association football forwards
Place of birth missing (living people)